Strigocossus hepialoides is a moth in the  family Cossidae. It was described by Yakovlev in 2011. It is found in Tanzania.

References

External links
Natural History Museum Lepidoptera generic names catalog

Zeuzerinae
Moths described in 2011